Batman '66 is a superhero comic book series published by DC Comics featuring Batman as a continuation of the 1966–68 television series starring Adam West and Burt Ward as Batman and Robin. The series was written primarily by Jeff Parker and Tom Peyer, with cover art by Mike Allred.  It published 30 issues from 2013–2016, although the setting has been used in occasional crossovers since 2016.

Publication history
In 2013, DC began publication of Batman '66, which tells all-new stories set in the world of the 1966–68 TV series. It was written by Jeff Parker, and featured cover art by Mike Allred while interior art was done by different artists each issue. Original characters from the television series such as the Bookworm, the Minstrel, the Sandman, Olga, Queen of the Cossacks, Zelda the Great, Shame, King Tut, and Marsha, Queen of Diamonds all made their first comic book appearances in the series. The Joker, The Penguin, Riddler, Catwoman and Mr. Freeze also appeared in the series. Characters who were not featured in the television series (some of them were created after the series ended) also appeared in Batman '66, with Red Hood and Dr. Quinn appearing in issue #3, Poison Ivy in issue #26, Bane in issue #27, The Scarecrow and Killer Croc in issue #28, Kobra in issue #72, Copperhead in Batman '66 Meets Wonder Woman '77 issue #5, Professor Hugo Strange in Batman '66 Meets the Man from U.N.C.L.E., and Ra's al Ghul and Talia al Ghul in Batman '66 Meets Wonder Woman '77. Also, new characters and vehicles were created for the series such as the Bat-Jet, used to follow False Face to Mount Rushmore, as well as a new villainess named Cleopatra.

The series was released both physically and digitally. The series was cancelled in 2015, with physical issue #30, cover-dated February 2016, and digital issue #73.

In April 2014, the first five issues were compiled into the Batman '66 Vol. 1 trade paperback. Additional volumes collecting the rest of the issues have since been released. Len Wein and José Luis García-López produced a comics adaptation of a Two-Face story written by Harlan Ellison originally intended for the Batman television series in the 1960s. In June 2014, Kevin Smith and Ralph Garman's six-issue Batman and the Green Hornet crossover miniseries, Batman '66 Meets The Green Hornet, began publication. There are also three other crossover miniseries with fellow 1960s and 1970s TV shows; The Man from U.N.C.L.E. with Batman '66 Meets the Man From U.N.C.L.E., TV's The Avengers with Batman '66 Meets Steed and Mrs. Peel, and Wonder Woman, as played by Lynda Carter, in Batman '66 Meets Wonder Woman '77. In July 2017, a new crossover one-shot issue called Batman '66 Meets the Legion of Super Heroes shows Batman and Robin teaming up with the Legion of Super Heroes. In July 2018, the Batman archvillains attempted to take over Riverdale in the crossover miniseries Archie Meets Batman '66.

It is unknown whether Batman '66 is represented in one of the current New 52 DC Multiverse alternate Earths.

Collected editions

Reception
Response to the series was positive. Benjamin Bailey of IGN gave the first issue a 9.8 out of 10, calling it "nothing short of brilliant", saying that "even if you aren't a fan of the classic TV show, you'll have a good time here. It's a blast from start to finish". Meanwhile, Den of Geek gave the first issue an 8 out of 10, saying that "Batman '66 looks like it might just fit right in with the spirit of the show's better episodes". The A.V. Clubs Oliver Sava, in reviewing the second issue, called it "a delightfully silly look at a bygone era of Batman, (and) also one of the year's finest superhero comics".

References 

DC Comics titles
2013 comics debuts
Adaptations of works by Harlan Ellison
Batman titles
Comics based on television series
Comics by Kevin Smith
Comics by Len Wein
Batman (TV series)